Alan Leslie Gillis (22 September 1936 – 6 May 2022) was an Irish Fine Gael politician and Farmers' leader. He was president of the Irish Farmers' Association from 1990 to 1994. He was elected to the European Parliament at the 1994 European election for the Leinster constituency. He was a member of the Committee on Agriculture and Rural Development in the European Parliament. 

He lost his seat at the 1999 European election to party running mate Avril Doyle. He stood unsuccessfully as a candidate at the 2007 general election in the Kildare South constituency.

He died on 6 May 2022.

References

External links

1936 births
2022 deaths
Politicians from County Kildare
Irish farmers
Fine Gael MEPs
MEPs for the Republic of Ireland 1994–1999